Dança dos Famosos 2014 is the eleventh season of the Brazilian reality television show Dança dos Famosos which premiered on July 27, 2014, with the competitive live shows beginning on the following week on August 3, 2014 at 7:30 / 6:30 p.m. (BRT/AMT) on Rede Globo.

On November 30, 2014, actor Marcello Melo Jr. & Raquel Guarini won the competition over actress Paloma Bernardi and Patrick Carvalho. Raquel is the first female professional partner to win the show twice.

Couples

Elimination chart

Key
 
 
  Eliminated
  Bottom two
  Dance-off
  Withdrew
  Runner-up
  Winner

Weekly results

Week 1 

 Presentation of the Celebrities

Aired: July 27, 2014

Week 2 
Week 1 – Men
Style: Disco
Aired: August 3, 2014
Judges

Running order

Week 3
Week 1 – Women
Style: Disco
Aired: August 10, 2014
Judges

Running order

Week 4
Week 2 – Men
Style: Forró
Aired: August 17, 2014
Judges

Running order

Week 5
Week 2 – Women
Style: Forró
Aired: August 24, 2014
Judges

Running order

Week 6
Week 3 – Men
Style: Rock and Roll
Aired: August 31, 2014
Judges

Running order

Week 7
Week 3 – Women
Style: Rock and Roll
Aired: September 7, 2014
Judges

Running order

Week 8
Dance-off
Style: Lambada
Aired: September 14, 2014
Judges

Running order

Week 9
Team A
Style: Funk
Aired: September 21, 2014
Judges

Running order

Week 10
Team B
Style: Funk
Aired: September 28, 2014
Judges

Running order

Week 11
Top 6
Style: Mambo
Aired: October 12, 2014
Judges

Running order

Week 12 
Top 6 Redux
Style: Foxtrot
Aired: October 19, 2014
Judges

Running order

Deadlock results

Week 13
Top 5
Style: Sertanejo
Aired: November 2, 2014
Judges

Running order

Week 14
Top 4
Style: Waltz
Aired: November 9, 2014
Judges

Running order

Week 15
Top 3
Style: Pasodoble
Aired: November 16, 2014
Judges

Running order

Week 16
Top 2
Style: Tango & Samba
Aired: November 30, 2014
Judges

Running order

References

External links
 

2014 Brazilian television seasons
Season 11